Canada competed at the 1992 Summer Olympics in Barcelona, Spain, held from 25 July to 9 August 1992. 295 competitors, 179 men and 116 women, took part in 199 events in 24 sports.

The Barcelona Olympics were at the time Canada's second most successful Summer Olympic Games (and most successful in a fully-attended Olympics), subsequently surpassed in number of medals won in 1996 and 2016, and then tied in the number of gold medals in 2020.

Medalists

Competitors
The following is the list of number of competitors in the Games.

Archery

Canada sent only men to Barcelona for archery.  Two of the three individuals did not qualify for the elimination rounds, nor did the team qualify for the team round.

Men's individual competition:
 Claude Rousseau – Round of 16 (→ 14th place) (1-1)
 Sylvain Cadieux – Ranking Round (→ 60th place) (0-0)
 Jeannot Robitaille – Ranking Round (→ 70th place) (0-0)

Men's team competition:
 Rousseau, Cadieux, and Robitaille – Ranking Round (→ 19th place) (0-0)

Athletics

Men's 100m
Ben Johnson (15th)
Bruny Surin (4th)

Men's 200m
Atlee Mahorn (20th)
Peter Ogilvie
Anthony Wilson (31st)

Men's 400m
Mike McLean (DNF)

Men's 800m
Freddie Williams

Men's 1500m
Graham Hood (9th)

Men's 5000m
Brendan Matthias (36th)

Men's 10000m
Paul Williams (DNP)

Men's marathon
Peter Maher (DNF)

Men's 4 × 100 m relay
Ben Johnson

Men's 4 × 400 m relay
Mark Jackson, Anthony Wilson, Mark Graham, and Frederick Williams
 Heat – 3:04.69 (→ did not advance)

Men's 110m hurdles
Mark McKoy 

Men's 400m hurdles
Mark Jackson (19th)

Men's 3000m Steeplechase
Graeme Fell (28th)

Men's 20 km Road Walk
Tim Berrett (14th)
Guillaume Leblanc 

Men's 50 km Road Walk
Tim Berrett (DSQ)
Guillaume Leblanc (DSQ)

Men's high jump
Alex Zaliauskas (27th)

Men's long jump
Edrick Floreal (28th)
Glenroy Gilbert (DSQ)
Ian James (20th)

Men's pole vault
Douglas Wood
 Qualification – 5.20 metres (→ did not advance)

Men's triple jump
Oral O'Gilvie (DNP)

Men's discus throw
Ray Lazdins (21st)

Men's javelin throw
Stephen Feraday (29th)

Men's shot put
Peter Dajia (25th)

Men's Decathlon
Mike Smith – did not finish (→ no ranking)

Women's 800 m
 Charmaine Crooks – 1:58,55 (→ 10th place)

Women's 1.500 m
 Paula Schnurr – 4:04,80 (→ 13th place)
 Angela Chalmers – 4:04,87 (→ 14th place)
 Debbie Bowker – 4:12,50 (→ 22nd place)

Women's 3.000 m
 Angela Chalmers – 8:47,22 (→  Bronze medal)
 Robyn Meagher – 8:49,72 (→ 15th place)
 Leah Pells – 9:13,19 (→ 27th place)

Women's 10.000 m
 Carole Rouillard – 32:53.83 (→ 22nd place)
 Lisa Harvey – 33:55.93 (→ 34th place)

Women's 4 × 400 m relay
 Charmaine Crooks, Rosey Edeh, Camille Noel, Jillian Richardson – 3:25,20 (→ 4th place)

Women's 100 m hurdles
 Katie Anderson – 13,31 (→ 19th place)

Women's 400 m hurdles
 Rosey Edeh – 55,76 (→ 13th place)
 Donalda Duprey – 56,30 (→ 15th place)

Women's 10 km walk
 Tina Poitras – 46:50 (→ 21st place)
 Janice McCaffrey – 48:05 (→ 25th place)
 Pascale Grand – 49:14 (→ 29th place)

Women's marathon
 Odette Lapierre – 2:46.18 (→ 19th place)
 Lizanne Bussieres – did not finish (→ no ranking)

Badminton

Boxing

Men's Light Flyweight (– 48 kg)
 Domenic Figliomeni
 First round – lost to Tadahiro Sasaki (JPN), 3:5

Men's flyweight (– 51 kg)
 Marty O'Donnell
 First round – lost to Robert Peden (AUS), 2:14

Men's featherweight (– 57 kg)
 Michael Strange
 First round – lost to Somluck Kamsing (THA), 9:11

Men's lightweight (– 60 kg)
 William Irwin
 First round – defeated Alan Andrew Vaughan (GBR), RSC-3
 Second round – lost to Ronald Chavez (PHI), 1:8

Men's Light-Welterweight (– 63.5 kg)
 Mark Leduc →  Silver medal
 First round – defeated Godfrey Wakaabu (UGA), 9:2
 Second round – defeated Dillon Carew (GUY), 5:0
 Quarterfinals – defeated Laid Bouneb (ALG), 8:1
 Semifinals – defeated Leonard Doroftei (ROM), 13:6
 Final – lost to Héctor Vinent (CUB), 1:11

Men's Light Middleweight (– 71 kg)
 Raymond Downey
 First round – lost to Hendrik Simangunsong (INA), 5:12

Men's middleweight (– 75 kg)
 Chris Johnson →  Bronze medal
 First round – bye
 Second round – defeated Mohamed Siluvangi (ZAI), RSCH-3
 Quarterfinals – defeated Stefan Trendafilov (BUL), RSC-1
 Semifinals – lost to Chris Byrd (USA), 3:17

Men's Light Heavyweight (– 81 kg)
 Robert Brown
 First round – defeated Damidin Zul (MGL), RSCH-2
 Second round – lost to Torsten May (GER), 1:7

Men's Heavyweight (– 91 kg)
 Kirk Johnson
 First round – bye
 Second round – defeated Joseph Akhasamba (KEN), RSC-2
 Quarterfinals – lost to David Izonritei (NGR), 5:9

Men's Super Heavyweight (>91 kg)
 Tom Glesby
 First round – bye
 Second round – lost to Roberto Balado (CUB), 2:16

Canoeing

Cycling

Fifteen cyclists, eleven men and four women, represented Canada in 1992. Curt Harnett won bronze in the men's sprint.

Men's road race
 Gianni Vignaduzzi
 Nathael Sagard
 Jacques Landry

Men's team time trial
 Colin Davidson
 Chris Koberstein
 Todd McNutt
 Yvan Waddell

Men's sprint
 Curt Harnett -  Bronze medal

Men's 1 km time trial
 Kurt Innes

Men's individual pursuit
 Michael Belcourt

Men's points race
 John Malois

Women's road race
 Alison Sydor – 2:05:03 (→ 12th place)
 Kelly-Ann Way – 2:05:03 (→ 31st place)
 Lena Hawkins – 2:05:33 (→ 36th place)

Women's sprint
 Tanya Dubnicoff

Women's individual pursuit
 Kelly-Ann Way

Diving

Men's 3m springboard
Mark Rourke
 Preliminary round – 379.32 points
 Final – 540.66 points (→ 11th place)
David Bédard
 Preliminary round – 372.54 points (→ did not advance, 12th place)

Men's 10m platform
Bruno Fournier
 Preliminary round – 370.68 (→ did not advance, 14th place)
William Hayes
 Preliminary round – 324.39 (→ did not advance, 21st place)

Women's 3m springboard
Mary DePiero
 Preliminary round – 278.76 points
Final – 449.49 points (→ 12th place)
 Evelyne Boisvert
 Preliminary round – 258.09 points (→ did not advance, 21st place)

Women's 10m platform
Paige Gordon
Preliminary round – 283.11 points (→ did not advance, 16th place)
Anne Montminy
Preliminary round – 282.42 points (→ did not advance, 17th place)

Equestrian

Fencing

16 fencers, 11 men and 5 women, represented Canada in 1992.

Men's foil
 Benoît Giasson

Men's épée
 Laurie Shong
 Danek Nowosielski
 Jean-Marc Chouinard

Men's team épée
 Jean-Marc Chouinard, Alain Côté, Allan Francis, Danek Nowosielski, Laurie Shong

Men's sabre
 Jean-Paul Banos
 Jean-Marie Banos
 Tony Plourde

Men's team sabre
 Jean-Paul Banos, Jean-Marie Banos, Tony Plourde, Evens Gravel, Leszek Nowosielski

Women's foil
 Thalie Tremblay
 Renée Aubin

Women's team foil
 Thalie Tremblay, Renée Aubin, Hélène Bourdages, Shelley Wetterberg, Marie-Françoise Hervieu

Gymnastics

Hockey

Women's team competition
The women's field hockey team from Canada competed for the third time at the Summer Olympics.
Preliminary round
 Canada – Australia 0-2
 Canada – Spain 1-2
 Canada – Germany 0-4
Classification matches
 5th-8th place: Canada – Netherlands 0-2
 7th-8th place: Canada – New Zealand 2-0 (→ 7th place)
Team roster
 Bernadette Bowyer
 Joel Brough
 Michelle Conn
 Deb Covey
 Sharon Creelman
 Tara Croxford
 Sherri Field
 Milena Gaiga
 Heather Jones
 Laurelee Kopeck
 Sandra Levy
 Rochelle Low
 Gaye Porteous
 Sue Reid
 Candy Thomson
 Deb Whitten
Head coach: Marina van der Merwe

Judo

Men's Competition
Extra-Lightweight (60 kg)
 Ewan Beaton

Half-Lightweight (65 kg)
 Jean-Pierre Cantin

Lightweight (71 kg)
 Roman Hatashita

Middleweight (87 kg)
 Nicolas Gill  Bronze medal

Half-Heavyweight (95 kg)
 Patrick Roberge

Women's Competition
Half-Lightweight (52 kg)
 Lyne Poirier

Lightweight (56 kg)
 Pascale Mainville

Extra-Lightweight (48 kg)
 Brigitte Lastrade

Half-Middleweight (61 kg)
 Michelle Buckingham

Middleweight (66 kg)
 Sandra Greaves

Half-Heavyweight (72 kg)
 Alison Webb

Heavyweight (+72 kg)
 Jane Patterson

Modern pentathlon

Two male pentathletes represented Canada in 1992.

Individual
 Ian Soellner
 Laurie Shong

Rhythmic gymnastics

Rowing

Sailing

Men's Sailboard (Lechner A-390)
Murray McCaig
 Final Ranking – 459.0 points (→ 44th place)

Women's Sailboard (Lechner A-390)
Caroll-Ann Alie
 Final Ranking – 161.7 points (→ 14th place)

Women's 470 Class
Penny Davis and Sarah McLean
 Final Ranking – 94.7 points (→ 11th place)

Shooting

Swimming

Men's Competition
Men's 50 m freestyle
 Stephen Clarke
 Heat – 23.95 (→ did not advance, 40th place)

Men's 100 m freestyle
 Stephen Clarke
 Heat – 50.73 (→ did not advance, 18th place)
 Darren Ward
 Heat – 52.05 (→ did not advance, 41st place)

Men's 200 m freestyle
 Turlough O'Hare
 Heat – 1:50.42
 B-Final – 1:51.01 (→ 14th place)
 Darren Ward
 Heat – 1:51.62 (→ did not advance, 23rd place)

Men's 400 m freestyle
 Turlough O'Hare
 Heat – 3:56.70 (→ did not advance, 21st place)
 Edward Parenti
 Heat – 3:58.96 (→ did not advance, 27th place)

Men's 1500 m freestyle
 Christopher Bowie
 Heat – 15:34.28 (→ did not advance, 15th place)
 David McLellan
 Heat – 15:58.38 (→ did not advance, 23rd place)

Men's 100 m Backstroke
 Mark Tewksbury
 Heat – 54.75
 Final – 53.98 (→  Gold medal)
 Raymond Brown
 Heat – 56.98 (→ did not advance, 18th place)

Men's 200 m Backstroke
 Kevin Draxinger
 Heat – 2:01.73
 B-Final – 2:01.79 (→ 12th place)
 Raymond Brown
 Heat – 2:01.81
 B-Final – 2:03.01 (→ 15th place)

Men's 100 m Breaststroke
 Jonathan Cleveland
 Heat – 1:02.73
 B-Final – 1:02.73 (→ 13th place)
 Curtis Myden
 Heat – 1:03.80 (→ did not advance, 25th place)

Men's 200 m Breaststroke
 Jonathan Cleveland
 Heat – 2:15.68
 B-Final – 2:16.20 (→ 14th place)
 Michael Mason
 Heat – 2:18.64 (→ did not advance, 23rd place)

Men's 100 m Butterfly
 Marcel Gery
 Heat – 53.94
 Final – 54.18 (→ 6th place)
 Tom Ponting
 Heat – 54.77
 B-Final – 55.00 (→ 16th place)

Men's 100 m Butterfly
 Tom Ponting
 Heat – 2:01.20
 B-Final – 2:01.60 (→ 13th place)
 Edward Parenti
 Heat – 2:02.00 (→ did not advance, 26th place)

Men's 200 m Individual Medley
 Gary Anderson
 Heat – 2:02.63
 Final – 2:04.30 (→ 8th place)
 Darren Ward
 Heat – 2:03.71
 B-Final – 2:05.09 (→ 14th place)

Men's 200 m Individual Medley
 Curtis Myden
 Heat – 4:22.41
 B-Final – 4:21.91 (→ 10th place)
 Robert Baird
 Heat – 4:24.31
 B-Final – 4:25.06 (→ 16th place)

Men's 4 × 200 m freestyle Relay
Edward Parenti, Darren Ward, Christopher Bowie, and Turlough O'Hare
 Heat – 7:25.61 (→ did not advance, 9th place)

Men's 4 × 100 m Medley Relay
Mark Tewksbury, Jonathan Cleveland, Tom Ponting, and Stephen Clarke
 Heat – 3:42.47
Mark Tewksbury, Jonathan Cleveland, Marcel Gery, and Stephen Clarke
 Final – 3:39.66 (→  Bronze medal)

Women's Competition
Women's 50 m freestyle
 Andrea Nugent
 Heat – 26.29
 B-Final – 26.17 (→ 9th place)
 Kristin Topham
 Heat – 26.32
 B-Final – 26.24 (→ 11th place)

Women's 100 m freestyle
 Andrea Nugent
 Heat – 56.82
 B-Final – 56.91 (→ 16th place)
 Allison Higson
 Heat – 58.47 (→ did not advance, 25th place)

Women's 200 m freestyle
 Nikki Dryden
 Heat – 2:03.59 (→ did not advance, 19th place)
 Allison Higson
 Heat – 2:04.25 (→ did not advance, 22nd place)

Women's 100 m Backstroke
 Nikki Dryden
 Heat – 1:03.71
 B-Final – 1:03.53 (→ 14th place)
 Julie Howard
 Heat – 1:05.26 (→ did not advance, 28th place)

Women's 200 m Backstroke
 Nikki Dryden
 Heat – 2:17.54 (→ did not advance, 23rd place)
 Beth Hazel
 Heat – 2:17.70 (→ did not advance, 25th place)

Women's 100 m Breaststroke
 Guylaine Cloutier
 Heat – 1:09.89
 Final – 1:09.71 (→ 4th place)
 Lisa Flood
 Heat – 1:10.95
 B-Final – 1:11.17 (→ 14th place)

Women's 200 m Breaststroke
 Guylaine Cloutier
 Heat – 2:29.01
 Final – 2:29.88 (→ 5th place)
 Nathalie Giguère
 Heat – 2:29.71
 Final – 2:30.11 (→ 6th place)

Women's 100 m Butterfly
 Kristin Topham
 Heat – 1:01.20
 B-Final – 1:01.91 (→ 14th place)
 Julie Howard
 Heat – 1:02.89 (→ did not advance, 27th place)

Women's 200 m Butterfly
 Jacinthe Pineau
 Heat – 2:19.44 (→ did not advance, 23rd place)

Women's 200 m Individual Medley
 Marianne Limpert
 Heat – 2:16.84
 Final – 2:17.09 (→ 6th place)
 Nancy Sweetnam
 Heat – 2:17.26
 Final – 2:17.13 (→ 7th place)

Women's 400 m Individual Medley
 Joanne Malar
 Heat – 4:52.85
 B-Final – 4:48.52 (→ 11th place)
 Nancy Sweetnam
 Heat – 4:52.41
 B-Final – 4:50.17 (→ 13th place)

Women's 4 × 100 m freestyle Relay
Marianne Limpert, Nikki Dryden, Andrea Nugent, and Allison Higson
 Heat – 3:49.28
 Final – 3:49.37 (→ 8th place)

Women's 4 × 100 m Medley Relay
Nikki Dryden, Guylaine Cloutier, Kristin Topham, and Andrea Nugent
 Heat – 4:11.67
 Final – 4:09.26 (→ 6th place)

Synchronized swimming

Three synchronized swimmers represented Canada in 1992.

Women's solo
 Sylvie Fréchette  Gold medal
 Penny Vilagos
 Vicky Vilagos

Women's duet  Silver medal
 Penny Vilagos
 Vicky Vilagos

Table tennis

Tennis

Men's Singles Competition
 Andrew Sznajder
 First round – defeated Benny Wijaya (Indonesia) 6-2, 6-4, 7-5
 Second round – lost to Jakob Hlasek (Switzerland) 6-4, 4-6, 3-6, 6-7

Men's Doubles Competition
 Brian Gyetko and Sebastien LeBlanc
 First round – defeated Kenneth Carlsen and Frederik Fetterlein (Denmark) 6-3, 7-6, 7-6
 Second round – lost to Wayne Ferreira and Piet Norval (South Africa) 3-6, 6-7, 4-6

Women's Singles Competition
 Patricia Hy-Boulais
 First round – defeated Dally Randriantefy (Madagascar) 6-2, 6-1
 Second round – lost to Mary Joe Fernandez (United States) 2-6, 6-1, 10-12

Women's Singles Competition
 Rene Simpson-Alter
 First round – lost to Kimiko Date (Japan) 5-7, 1-6

Women's Doubles Competition
 Patricia Hy-Boulais and Rene Simpson-Alter
 First round – lost to Isabelle Demongeot and Nathalie Tauziat (France) 6-3, 3-6, 2-6

Volleyball

Men's team competition
 Preliminary round (group A)
 Lost to Spain 15-13 7-15 15-9 12-15 13-15
 Lost to United States 12-15 12-15 15-10 15-12 14-16
 Defeated France 15-11 15-6 15-8
 Lost to Italy 11-15 15-8 12-15 7-15
 Lost to Japan 15-11 17-15 11-15 13-15 10-15
 Quarterfinals
 did not advance
 Classification match
 9th/10th place: lost to South Korea (1-3) → 10th place
 Team roster
 Marc Albert
 Kevin Boyles
 Gino Brousseau
 Allan Coulter
 Christopher Frehlick
 Terrance Gagnon
 Randal Gingera
 Kent Greves
 William Knight
 Russell Paddock
 Greg Williscroft
 Bradley Willock

Weightlifting

Wrestling

See also

Canada at the 1990 Commonwealth Games
Canada at the 1991 Pan American Games
Canada at the 1994 Commonwealth Games

References

Nations at the 1992 Summer Olympics
1992
Summer Olympics